Triumphus crucis (English: The Triumph of the Cross) is a book by Girolamo Savonarola It was written to show his feelings about the Catholic church and to refute accusations of heresy. The book was published in the 15th century.  It was originally published in Latin but later translations have been made.

Structure
The book is divided into four books. The first book addresses the existence, nature and providence of God and attempts to prove the immorality of the soul of a man. The second book shows how the Christian faith is the true faith. The third book points out that there is nothing impossible in the mysteries in of the Christian faith. The fourth book is devoted to an exposition of truth of the religion taught by Jesus.

In the book Girolamo Savonarola also explains why images were useful for retaining religious ideas in memory and for understanding their complexity.

Translations
The Triumph of the Cross; [Girolamo Savonarola]. Translated from the Latin, with notes and a biographical sketch, by O'Dell Travers Hill, F.R.G.S. London: Hodder and Stoughton, 1868
The Triumph of the Cross; tr. ed., with intr., by J. Procter. London: Sands and Co., 1901 (John Procter was Provincial of the English Dominicans)
The Truth of the Christian Faith, or, The triumph of the cross of Christ; by Hier. Savonarola; done into English out of the authours own Italian copy. Cambridge: printed by John Field, 1661 (Wing S780)
The Verity of Christian Faith; Written by Hierome Savanorola [sic] of Ferrara. London: printed by R. Daniel (translation of book 2; Wing S781)

References

External links
Triumph of the Cross (archive.org)

15th-century books
Girolamo Savonarola